Julian Munson Sturtevant (August 9, 1908 – August 12, 2005) was an American chemist and educator. Sturtevant was Professor Emeritus of Chemistry, Molecular Biophysics, and Biochemistry at Yale University.

Career
Born in New Jersey to Edgar Howard Sturtevant, a linguistics professor at Yale University, and Bessie Fitch Skinner, the family descends from Samuel Sturtevant, an early settler of Plymouth Colony. Sturtevant's great-grandfather was Julian Monson Sturtevant, the second president of Illinois College, and his uncle was Alfred Sturtevant, a noted geneticist.

Sturtevant obtained his Bachelor of Arts from Columbia University in 1927, and his Doctor of Philosophy in Chemistry from Yale in 1931. He joined the faculty there in that same year. Sturtevant chaired the Department of Chemistry from 1959 to 1962, and continued to teach until retirement in 1977, becoming Professor Emeritus of Chemistry, Molecular Biophysics, and Biochemistry.

Sturtevant was known for applying thermochemistry to the study of biology, and pioneered the collection of kinetic data for studying organic chemical reactions and designed unique calorimeters that allowed for more accurate heat measurements long before high-precision ones became available. His former student and Rutgers professor Kenneth Breslauer credited him for having "...practically founded the field of biothermodynamics."

For his work, Sturtevant received a Guggenheim Fellowship (1955), was elected to both the American Academy of Arts and Sciences and National Academy of Sciences (1973), and was awarded the Wilbur Cross Medal (1987).

See also
List of Columbia College people
List of Guggenheim Fellowships awarded in 1955
List of members of the National Academy of Sciences (Biochemistry)
List of people from New Jersey
List of Yale University people

References

External links
Yale University obituary

1908 births
2005 deaths
Academics from New Jersey
20th-century American chemists
American chemists
Columbia College (New York) alumni
Yale University alumni
Yale University faculty
Members of the United States National Academy of Sciences